As an important river port, there has been six fireboats operated by the Detroit Fire Department.

References

External links

 
Water transportation in Michigan
History of Detroit
Detroit Fire Department